James Andrew was one of the two MPs for Ipswich in a variety of English Parliaments from 1410 to December 1421.

References

Andrew